The Department of Industry, Technology and Regional Development was an Australian government department that existed between March 1993 and March 1994.

Scope
Information about the department's functions and/or government funding allocation could be found in the Administrative Arrangements Orders, the annual Portfolio Budget Statements and in the Department's annual reports.

According to the Administrative Arrangements Order (AAO) made on 24 March 1993, the Department dealt with:
Manufacturing and commerce including industries development
Science and technology, including industrial research and development
Export services
Marketing, including export promotion, of manufactures and services
Small business
Construction industry (excluding residential construction)
Duties of customs and excise
Bounties on the production of goods
Offsets, to the extent not dealt with by the Department of Defence
Patents of inventions and designs, and trade marks
Weights and measures
Civil space program
Commission for the Future
Regional development

Structure
The Department was an Australian Public Service department, staffed by officials who were responsible to the Minister for Industry, Technology and Regional Development. The Ministers were Alan Griffiths (until 23 January 1994) and then Peter Cook (from 30 January 1994). The Ministers were assisted in the role by a Parliamentary Secretary, Ted Lindsay.

From 24 March 1993 to 19 December 1993, the Secretary of the Department was Neville Stevens; from 20 December 1993 to 25 March 1994, the Secretary was Sandy Hollway.

References

Ministries established in 1993
Industry, Technology and Regional Development
1993 establishments in Australia
1994 disestablishments in Australia